The Christian Conference of Asia is a regional ecumenical organisation representing 15 National Councils and over 100 denominations (churches) in New Zealand, Australia, Bangladesh, Burma, Cambodia, East Timor, Hong Kong, India, Indonesia, Laos, Japan, Korea, Malaysia, Pakistan, Philippines, Sri Lanka, Taiwan and Thailand.

These councils and churches are committed to working together in mission, leadership development, ecumenical relationships, and issues of social justice such as human rights, peace and reconciliation, poverty alleviation, and interfaith dialogue.

The offices of the Christian Conference of Asia are located in Payap University, Chiang Mai, Thailand; the General Secretary (since 2015) is Dr Mathews George Chunakara.

History 

Representatives of churches, national council of churches, and Christian councils decided to constitute the East Asian Christian Conference during a meeting at Prapat, Indonesia in 1957. It was inaugurated at an assembly in Kuala Lumpur, Malaysia, in 1957 under the theme Witnessing Together. The fifth Assembly in 1973, meeting in Singapore, decided to change the name to Christian Conference of Asia (CCA). It established its regional offices in Singapore at Toa Payoh Methodist Church in 1974. 

The organisation operated from Singapore until its expulsion from the country in 1987, when the Singapore government charged that it was engaging in political activities and had broken a promise of not doing so. The organisation's assets were frozen and eventually returned in 1988. Member churches and council in Singapore, the Methodist Church of Singapore, the Anglican Church of Singapore and Singapore's National Council of Church withdrew from the organisation, leaving the organisation with no official representations from Singapore since. The organisation replied to the charges that there was a 'basic misunderstanding of the role of the Church in society and they way which church and state relate to each other'.

Member churches
 Aotearoa - New Zealand (5)
 Anglican Church in Aotearoa, New Zealand and Polynesia
 Christian Churches, New Zealand
 Methodist Church of New Zealand
 Presbyterian Church of Aotearoa New Zealand
 Religious Society of Friends
 Australia (5)
 Anglican Church of Australia
 Armenian Apostolic Church, Diocese of Australia and New Zealand
 Churches of Christ in Australia
 Coptic Orthodox Diocese of Sydney & Affiliated Regions and SE Asia
 Uniting Church in Australia
 Bangladesh (4)
 Bangladesh Baptist Fellowship
 Bangladesh Baptist Church Sangha
 Church of Bangladesh
 Evangelical Christian Church
 Hong Kong SAR, China (4)
 Church of Christ in China
 Sheng Kung Hui (Anglican Church)
 The Methodist Church, Hong Kong
 The Salvation Army, Hong Kong and Macau Command
 India (12)
 Church of North India
 Church of South India
 Council of Baptist Churches in Northeast India
 Hindustani Covenant Church
 Jacobite Syrian Orthodox Church
 Malabar Independent Syrian Church
 Malankara Orthodox Syrian Church
 Mar Thoma Syrian Church of Malabar
 Methodist Church in India
 Presbyterian Church in India
 Samavesam of Telugu Baptist Churches
 United Evangelical Lutheran Church in India (UELCI)
 Indonesia (31)
 Banua Niha Keriso Protestan (BNKP) (Nias Protestant Christian Church)
 Gereja Batak Karo Protestan (GBKP) (Karo Batak Protestant Church)
 Gereja Isa Almasih (GIA)
 Gereja Kalimantan Evangelis (GKE) (Kalimantan Evangelical Church)
 Gereja Kristen Indonesia (GKI) (Indonesia Christian Church)
 Gereja Kristen Injili Di Tanah Papua (GKI-Tanah Papua) (Evangelical Christian Church in Tanah Papua)
 Greja Kristen Jawi Wetan (Christian Church of Eastern Java)
 Gereja Kristen Pasundan (GKP) (Pasundan Christian Church)
 Gereja Kristen Protestan Angkola (GKPA)
 Gereja Kristen Protestan Bali (GKPB) (Protestant Christian Church in Bali)
 Gereja Kristen Protestan Indonesia (GKPI) (Christian Protestant Church in Indonesia)
 Gereja Kristen Protestan Simalungun (GKPS) (Simalungun Protestant Christian Church)
 Gereja Kristen Sulawesi Tengah (GKST) (Central Sulawesi Christian Church)
 Gereja Kristen Sumba (GKS) (Christian Church of Sumba)
 Gereja Methodis Indonesia (GMI)
 Gereja Masehi Injili di Bolaang Mongondow (GMIBM)
 Gereja Masehi Injili Halmahera (GMIH)
 Gereja Masehi Injili Minahasa (GMIM) (The Christian Evangelical Church in Minahasa)
 Gereja Masehi Injili Sangihe Talaud (GMIST) (Evangelical Church of Sangir Talaud)
 Gereja Masehi Injili di Timor (GMIT) (Protestant Evangelical Church in Timor)
 Gereja Protestan di Indonesia Bagian Barat (GPIB)
 Gereja Protestan di Sulawesi Tenggara (GEPSULTRA)
 Gereja Punguan Kristen Batak (GPKB) (Batak Christian Community Church)
 Gereja Protestan Maluku (GPM) (Protestant Church in the Moluccas)
 Gereja Toraja (Toraja Church)
 Huria Kristen Batak Protestant (HKBP) (Batak Protestant Christian Church)
 Huria Kristen Indonesia (HKI) (The Indonesian Christian Church)
 Kerapatan Gereja Protestan Minahasa
 Persatuan Gereja Gereja Kristen Muria Indonesia (GKMI)
 Sinode Gerejagereja Kristen Jawa (GKJ) (Javanese Christian Churches)
 Sinode Gereja Kristen Oikoumene di Indonesia (GKO) (The Synod of the Oikoumene Christian Church in Indonesia)
 Iran (1)
 Armenian Orthodox Church of Iran
 Japan (3)
 Korean Christian Church in Japan
 Nihon Kirisuto Kyodan (United Church of Christ in Japan)
 Nippon Sei Ko Kai (Anglican)
 Korea (7)
 Anglican Church of Korea
 Korean Evangelical Churches
 Korean Methodist Church
 Presbyterian Church in the Republic of Korea
 Presbyterian Church of Korea
 Salvation Army
 Laos (1)
 Lao Evangelical Church
 Malaysia (3)
 Church of the Province of South East Asia 
 Diocese of Sabah
 Diocese of Kuching
 Diocese of West Malaysia
 Evangelical Lutheran Church in Malaysia and Singapore
 Methodist Church in Malaysia
 Myanmar (7)
 Myanmar Baptist Convention
 Church of the Province of Myanmar
 Independent Presbyterian Church of Myanmar
 Mara Evangelical Church
 Methodist Church, Lower Myanmar
 Methodist Church, Upper Myanmar
 Presbyterian Church of Myanmar
 Pakistan (2)
 Church of Pakistan
 Presbyterian Church of Pakistan
 Philippines (10)
 Convention of Philippine Baptist Churches
 Iglesia Evangelica Metodista en las Islas Filipinas (Evangelical Methodist Church in the Philippines)
 Iglesia Unida Ecumenical
 Iglesia Filipina Independiente (Philippine Independent Church)
 Apostolic Catholic Church (Philippines)
 The Episcopal Church in the Philippines
 Lutheran Church in the Philippines
 United Church of Christ in the Philippines (UCCP)
 The United Methodist Church in the Philippines
 The Salvation Army Philippines
 
 Sri Lanka (3)
 Sri Lanka Baptist Sangamaya
 Church of Ceylon
 Methodist Church in Sri Lanka
 Taiwan (3)
 Episcopal Church
 Methodist Church in the Republic of China
 Presbyterian Church in Taiwan
 Thailand (1)
 Church of Christ in Thailand
 East Timor (1)
 Igreja Protestante Timor Loro Sae (IPTL)

Member Councils
 Te Runanga Whakawhanaunga I Nga Hahi O Aotearoa
 National Council of Churches in Australia
 National Council of Churches in Bangladesh
 National Christian Council of Bhutan
 Hong Kong Christian Council
 National Council of Churches in India
 Communion of Churches in Indonesia
 National Christian Council in Japan
 Kampuchea Christian Council
 National Council of Churches in Korea
 Council of Churches of Malaysia
 Myanmar Council of Churches
 National Council of Churches of Nepal
 National Council of Churches in the Philippines
 National Christian Council of Sri Lanka
 National Council of Churches of Taiwan

Associated bodies
Australian Student Christian Movement
National Council of Churches in Australia
World Council of Churches
World Student Christian Federation

References

External links

Regional councils of churches
Members of the World Council of Churches
Christian organizations established in 1957